Salvador Videgain Gómez (1845–1906) was a Spanish actor, singer, producer and composer.

Private life
Videgain was born in Málaga in 1845. He is of Spanish, English, Irish and Basque ancestry.
Videgain married actress Antonia García de Videgain in 1868 and founded the artistic Videgain family, the most long lived in the history of theatre in Europe. They had two children: Antonio Videgain (born March 1869) and Salvador Videgain Jr. (born 26 February 1886). His grandson was Antonio Videgain Reparaz (born in 1892), and the descendant of Salvador Jr. Juan José Videgain (born in 1975). As he was the youngest son of his house and his grandmother and father died as a child, he always lived the maternal love and that of his older brothers, among whom was Guillermo, founder of a long family of military sailors and businessmen, with whom the family will have a long relationship.

Career
He began to work as a professional singer in his native Málaga in the early 1860s.
His family relocated often, as his father worked at different jobs along the coast. He later transferred to Cadiz, where he began acting in dramas.  was the beginning in Gibraltar. 1866 was a great year for him and his future wife. Its works from then on will stop being realized in the capitals of the south of Spain, especially of the cities of Andalusia.

In the spring of 1880 came a tour of Portugal and Galicia, which would be the season of his consecration as a prestigious artist. This year Videgain played the lead role in the comedy . The title was a commercial failure, but was appreciated by critics. At this point, Videgain and wife were receiving 60% of all profits in their company. Videgain and his wife Antonia, Vicente García Valero, José Talavera and others worked on the provocative work , inspired by newspaper articles about politics in Spain. He also appeared in the period comedy  (1884) about a private eye and his partner who get mixed up with trouble.

Later works
In the 1890s he worked with their own successful pieces in the Spanish provinces, such as the Canary Islands, Mallorca, Murcia, and Andalusia... began to be released in smaller roles. Their works were The daughters of the Zebedee, Sea lions, and. Later he had to adopt new works of popular taste but no longer had the force of youth and began accepting acting roles in generic lyrical and Spanish operettas by Federico Chueca, Ruperto Chapí, Tomás Bretón,  and many others. Their works were La gran via, La fiesta de San Antón, La verbena de la Paloma, and Gigantes y cabezudos.

In 1894 the entire family traveled to Buenos aires, Argentina, for work with La verbena de la Paloma, famous title of zarzuela new; the triumph was great and they remained premiered in the city during many months with the work and premiering others that arrived from Spain to premiere.

During the twentieth century his works are related to his work as a representative of his wife and on several occasions he appears as the representative of the company of artists in charge of managing the tours of the 1900–1903 seasons. During his career he came to perform more than 500 works as a singer.

Music
Videgain had a strong passion for music, particularly zarzuela and operettas. He was a pianist and composer and although he was never successful as a professional musician, he passed on the influence to his son Antonio Videgain, who became a successful singer and composer. Zarzuela played an important role in Videgain's life. He developed as a ragtime pianist early on and had originally intended to pursue a career in music by studying for a music theory degree after high school. Videgain co-wrote "". He composed piano pieces for Antonia and the song "" with music by Videgain and son.

In 1900, Videgain composed one title about the Don Juan Tenorio. This work was blamed on Salvador Videgain's son who never performed compositional tasks. Invictus, which was met with generally positive reviews. His "Inspirational work, Videgain's title has a predictable trajectory, but every scene brims with surprising details that accumulate into a rich fabric of history, cultural impressions and emotion european."

Prizes
Videgain received multiple awards and nominations for his work in theatre. He sang with famous voices such as José Sigler, Enrique Lacasa, Bonifacio Pinedo, Ventura de la Vega and Miguel Fleta. He is one of the few singers best known as an actor to be recognized in the 19th century. As a representative of his wife Doña Antonia García F. de Guzmán, he collected some of his awards in his later years, since she could not always attend the events, due to scheduling or health reasons.

References
 La correspondencia musical.Temporada de Bilbao 1882-83, Bajo de género cómico, pág 6  
 I COMICI TRONATI Don Salvatore, Salvador VIDEGAIN 
  Edición del sábado, 21 agosto 1886, página 6
  Edición del jueves, 30 mayo 1889, página 2 La vanguardía de Barcelona.

Further reading
  (2005) Juan Jose Videgain 
  (1944), Enrique Chicote.
  (1949), José Deleito Piñuela.
  (1918) José Fancos Rodríguez.
  ICCMU (2003) Vol.II varios autores 
  (1992) F.Hernández Girbal Ed. Lira 1992 
  (1940) Francisco Cuenca Benet, Editorial Maza. 
  (1988) Fundación banco exterior.
  (2018) Madrid: P & V,

Press
  (1876–1887).
  (1873–1887).
  (1887–1900).
  (1876).
  (1890–1906).
  (1873–1979).
 ABC (1902–1906).
  (1870–1900).
  Rev. 1999.
 , Barcelona. (1880–1906).
  (1880–1906).
  (1880–1900).
  (1880–1900).

External links
 http://lazarzuela.webcindario.com/RES/r_musicaclasica.htm
 http://malagapersonajes.blogspot.com/2011/03/salvador-vidagain-gomez-musico.html
 http://www.cervantesvirtual.com/obra-visor/signa-revista-de-la-asociacion-espanola-de-semiotica--1/html/027e2832-82b2-11df-acc7-002185ce6064_38.html

1845 births
1906 deaths
People from Málaga
Spanish male stage actors
Spanish male composers
Salvador
19th-century Spanish male actors
Theatre managers and producers
Spanish emigrants to Brazil
Spanish emigrants to Argentina
19th-century Spanish male singers
19th-century Spanish businesspeople
20th-century Spanish businesspeople